Peverill is a surname and given name, being a variant of the surname Peverall, which means "little pepper". Notable people with the surname include:

Surname
Damien Peverill (born 1979), Australian former rules footballer
Noel Peverill (1907-1997), Australian rules footballer

Given name
Peverill Squire (born 1955), American political scientist

See also
Peveril (disambiguation)
Peverel (disambiguation)
Peverell (disambiguation)